Cap Canaille is a headland situated in the Bouches-du-Rhône département, in southern France, on the Mediterranean Sea coast between the towns Cassis and La Ciotat and about 27 km (16 mi) from the centre of Marseille. At , it is the highest sea cliff of France. The rock face of Cap Canaille is called Falaises de Soubeyrannes. The rock consists of layers of ochre-coloured sandstone, conglomerate and limestone from the Turonian age on top of grey marl from the Cenomanian until the Turonian age. The Corniche des Crêtes road runs over the top of the cliff.

The name in Provençal is Cap Naio. It has been misunderstood in French and changed into Cap Canaille instead of "Cap Naille".

References

Canaille
Landforms of Provence-Alpes-Côte d'Azur
Massif des Calanques